Yoshiyuki Sankai (born 1958/1959) is a Japanese billionaire businessman and academic, the founder, president and CEO of the cyborg-robot maker Cyberdyne; and professor of the Graduate School of Systems & Information Engineering at the University of Tsukuba.

Early life
Sankai has a doctorate in engineering from the University of Tsukuba.

Career

Sankai is a professor of the Graduate School of Systems & Information Engineering at the University of Tsukuba. He is also a visiting professor at Baylor College of Medicine, Houston, Texas, US.

Sankai led the University of Tsukuba and Cyberdyne team that developed the HAL (Hybrid Assistive Limb) powered exoskeleton.
Sankai later became an international fellow at the Royal Swedish Academy of Engineering Sciences (IVA).

Personal life
Sankai lives in Ibaraki, Japan.

References

Living people
1950s births
Japanese billionaires
Japanese inventors
University of Tsukuba alumni
Academic staff of the University of Tsukuba
Japanese chief executives
Japanese company founders
Technology company founders
20th-century Japanese businesspeople
21st-century Japanese businesspeople